The 2022 season for  is the team's 39th season overall and the fourth season under the current name. The team has been a UCI WorldTeam since 2005, when the tier was first established. They use Cervélo bicycles, Shimano drivetrain, Shimano wheels and Agu clothing.

The team started their season at the Volta a la Comunitat Valenciana.

Team roster 

Riders who joined the team for the 2022 season

Riders who left the team during or after the 2021 season

One-day races 
The team's first One-day Race victory came at Omloop Het Nieuwsblad where Wout van Aert attacked from a small group of 'favorites' with 13 km to go at the base of the Bosberg. He managed to get a gap of 10s with 9.6 km to go. At 3 km to the finish he had a gap of 27s and managed to hold off the chasing group and win the race.

Also on at the same time was the Faun-Ardèche Classic where the team sent a strong team with leader Primož Roglič. An attack by Kuss with 7 km to go dropped Champoussin from the group. The remaining pair held of the peloton but didn't catch McNulty and sprinted for the line with Kuss finishing third.

The following day was the La Drôme Classic where Dane Jonas Vingegaard showed he was in good form by taking the win. On the Côte des Roberts Ayuso attacked with Vingegaard the only rider able to follow, the pair worked together having an advantage of 17s to the chasing grouop and 54s to the peloton with 20 km remaining. With 300m to go Vingegaard attacked with chasers Benoît Cosnefroy and Guillaume Martin passing Ayuso but coming to finish 3s behind Vingegaard.

Stage races 
The first stage race that the team rode was the Volta a la Comunitat Valenciana. The team came to the race in support of Dutch sprinter David Dekker hoping to win stages. With 12 km to go in stage 2 Dekker, a stage which the team was working for him, crashed into a ravine after mis-judging a corner in the descent. Although he escaped serious injury he still abandoned the race that stage. The team didn't start stage 4 and pulled all riders from the race after members of the team tested positive for COVID-19.

The Volta ao Algarve was the next stage race for the team. Norwegian Tobias Foss was the team's leader in the race with Maarten Wynants, Team Directeur sportif, stating "Tobias can do well here". The first mountain stage was stage 2 of the tour with Foss crashing in the final sprint after bumping shoulders with Sergio Higuita he lost 41s to stage winner David Gaudu. The stage 4 time trial was dominated by Belgian Remco Evenepoel taking the victory by 58s with Foss finishing in fourth 1 minute and 11s down. Stage 5 was the final stage which finished up another mountain. Foss came home sixth securing his sixth place overall in the Tour. Johannes Staune-Mittet who is part of the development team, and rode with the Pro team at this race finished second in the Youth classification.

Season victories

National, Continental, and World Champions

Notes

References

External links 

 

Team Jumbo–Visma men
2022
Team Jumbo–Visma men